Dolow, also spelled Doolow, is a town in the southern Gedo region of Somalia.

Balet Hawo District lies west of Dolow near the North Eastern Province.

District
Dolow town is the seat of one of the Gedo region's seven districts, Doolow District. 

Dolow is located on the border with Ethiopia alongside the Dawa River where it meets the Juba River.

See also
 Dolo, Ethiopia

Notes

References
Dooloow
Dōlow, Somalia

Populated places in Gedo
Jubba River
Ethiopia–Somalia border crossings